Christopher Kelly may refer to:
 Christopher Kelly (civil servant) (born 1946), British civil servant, chairman of the charity NSPCC
 Christopher Kelly (historian) (born 1964), author of Ruling the Later Roman Empire
 Christopher Kelly (author), author of A Push and a Shove
 Christopher Kelly (politician), chief fundraiser under Rod Blagojevich
 Christopher John Kelly (born 1888), British politician and trade unionist

See also
 Chris Kelly (disambiguation)